The 1820 United States presidential election in Ohio took place between November 1 and December 6, 1820, as part of the 1820 United States presidential election. Voters chose 8 representatives, or electors to the Electoral College, who voted for President and Vice President.

Ohio re-elected incumbent Democratic-Republican Party President James Monroe by a large margin. Although Monroe ran unopposed, John Quincy Adams received a minority of the vote as an opposition candidate.

Results

See also
 United States presidential elections in Ohio

References

Ohio
1820
1820 Ohio elections